The Pedley Hills are a low mountain range of the northern Peninsular Ranges System, in northwestern Riverside County, California. They are named for William Pedley, a civil engineer, who emigrated to the United States from England.

Geography
The hills are located within the city of Jurupa Valley, to the north and west of, and across the Santa Ana River from, the city of Riverside. The community of Rubidoux, a neighborhood of Jurupa Valley, is on the eastern side of the Pedley Hills, the neighborhood of Mira Loma is on the west and the neighborhood of Pedley is to the northwest.

The taller Jurupa Mountains are nearby to the north.

The hills are the location of the Indian Hills Golf Club.

See also
Jurupa Mountains
Mount Rubidoux

References 

Hills of California
Peninsular Ranges
Mountain ranges of Riverside County, California
Crestmore Heights, California
Fontana, California
Jurupa Valley, California